Grzegorz Kołacz (born 20 September 1966 in Nowa Ruda) is a Polish politician. She was elected to Sejm on 25 September 2005, getting 6904 votes in 2 Wałbrzych district as a candidate from the Samoobrona Rzeczpospolitej Polskiej list.

See also
Members of Polish Sejm 2005-2007

External links
Grzegorz Kołacz - parliamentary page - includes declarations of interest, voting record, and transcripts of speeches.

1966 births
Living people
People from Nowa Ruda
Members of the Polish Sejm 2005–2007
Self-Defence of the Republic of Poland politicians